"Backfired" is the debut solo single from American singer and Blondie vocalist Debbie Harry. Released in 1981, it was taken from her debut solo studio album, KooKoo.

Song information
"Backfired" peaked at number 32 in the UK, and number 43 on the US Billboard Hot 100 (though it remains Harry's highest-charting solo single in the US). It also peaked at number 71 on the US Hot Soul Singles chart, and number 29 on the Dance chart. The single also managed to become a hit in only a few other countries including Sweden and Australia.

In an attempt to distinguish herself as a solo artist, Harry's image upon the single's release was quite different from her established image with Blondie. She had dyed her hair darker and had a new sci-fi-inspired look, as seen in the music video for the song directed by H.R. Giger, who appeared in the video wearing a mask and mimes the male back-up vocals on the song.

Produced by Nile Rodgers and Bernard Edwards of the Chic who had just produced a huge hit album for Diana Ross, "Backfired" further developed Harry's experimentation with dance music as seen in some of Blondie's material (the Chic-inspired "Rapture" having been a No. 1 hit for them earlier the same year), this time delving more into funk music.

The 7" edit of "Backfired" appears on the Chrysalis Records/EMI compilation Most of All - The Best of Deborah Harry. A remix of the track by Bruce Forrest and Frank Heller was included on the 1988 Blondie/Debbie Harry remix compilation Once More into the Bleach. The original extended 12" mix from 1981 appears as a bonus track on both the 1994 and 2005 CD re-issues of the album KooKoo.

Critical reception
In single review prior LP release David Hepworth of Smash Hits was disappointed by this song by saying that "if this is the best that KooKoo has to offer then Debbie Harry's solo career is going to be short".

Track listing
7-inch single
"Backfired" (7″ Edit) (Nile Rodgers, Bernard Edwards) - 3:34 
"Military Rap" (Deborah Harry, Chris Stein) - 3:47

12-inch single
"Backfired" (12″ Mix) (Nile Rodgers, Bernard Edwards) - 6:23
"Military Rap" (Deborah Harry, Chris Stein) - 3:47

Charts

References

1981 debut singles
1981 songs
Chrysalis Records singles
Debbie Harry songs
Song recordings produced by Bernard Edwards
Song recordings produced by Nile Rodgers
Songs written by Bernard Edwards
Songs written by Nile Rodgers